is a Japanese professional footballer who plays as a forward for  club Shimizu S-Pulse.

Club career
In 2019, Disaro joined J3 League team Giravanz Kitakyushu after playing for Hosei University. In his debut season, he scored 16 goals and helped Giaravanz gain promotion to the J2 League. In his second season, Disaro finished with 18 goals and was second top-scorer in the division behind Peter Utaka. During this season, Disaro was awarded the August J.League Monthly MVP award after contributing 6 goals and 2 assists in 6 games.

In December 2020, Disaro moved to J1 League club Shimizu S-Pulse. He played one full season at the club, before moving on loan to Montedio Yamagata mid-way through the 2022 season.

Disaro returned to Shimizu S-Pulse for 2023 season.

Personal life
Disaro born in Tokyo, Japan. Due to Japanese-Italian half born with an Italian father.

Career statistics

Club
.

References

External links

1996 births
Living people
Japanese footballers
Japanese people of Italian descent
Association football forwards
Giravanz Kitakyushu players
Shimizu S-Pulse players
Montedio Yamagata players
J1 League players
J2 League players
J3 League players
Association football people from Tokyo